The Cederberg Local Municipality consists of eleven members elected by mixed-member proportional representation. Six councillors are elected by first-past-the-post voting in six wards, while the remaining five are chosen from party lists so that the total number of party representatives is proportional to the number of votes received. In the election of 1 November 2021, no party won a majority, with the African National Congress the largest party with four seats.

Results 
The following table shows the composition of the council after past elections.

December 2000 election

The following table shows the results of the 2000 election.

By-elections from December 2000 to October 2002
The following by-elections were held to fill vacant ward seats in the period between the election in December 2000 and the floor crossing period in October 2002.

October 2002 floor crossing

In terms of the Eighth Amendment of the Constitution and the judgment of the Constitutional Court in United Democratic Movement v President of the Republic of South Africa and Others, in the period from 8–22 October 2002 councillors had the opportunity to cross the floor to a different political party without losing their seats. In the Cederberg council the Democratic Alliance (DA) lost two councillors to the New National Party (NNP), which had formerly been part of the DA. The single councillor from the United Democratic Movement crossed to the DA.

March 2006 election

The following table shows the results of the 2006 election.

By-elections from March 2006 to May 2011
The following by-elections were held to fill vacant ward seats in the period between the elections in March 2006 and May 2011.

May 2011 election

The following table shows the results of the 2011 election.

By-elections from May 2011 to August 2016
The following by-elections were held to fill vacant ward seats in the period between the elections in May 2011 and August 2016.

August 2016 election

The following table shows the results of the 2016 election.

The DA subsequently lost two seats to the African National Congress (ANC) in by-elections held on 12 December 2018, and 18 September 2019.

The council was reconfigured as seen below:

On 26 June 2019, DA councillor Bertie Zass voted with the ANC to remove the DA-ADC coalition from power. The elected Executive Mayor was Sylvia Quinta with Mariaan Nell as the Deputy Executive Mayor. The appointed Speaker was Paul Strauss. They were all party members of the African National Congress. The ward Zass previously held automatically became vacant, because of his party defection.

On 22 July 2019, the Western Cape High Court ruled that the elections of the ANC councillors to senior municipal positions were unlawful. The court ordered the reinstatement of DA Mayor William Farmer and ADC Deputy Mayor Francina Sokuyeka. However, in the by-election held on 18 September 2019, the ANC won the vacant ward from the DA, giving the ANC a majority in the council.

November 2021 election

The following table shows the results of the 2021 election.

By-elections from November 2021
The following by-elections were held to fill vacant ward seats in the period since the election in November 2021.

After the 2021 election, Cederberg First (or Cederberg Eerste, CE) (3), the DA (2) and Freedom Front Plus (FF+) (1) formed a coalition. A motion of no-confidence in CE mayor Ruben Richards, after he was accused of corruption, was later passed with the support of one DA councillor, the speaker William Farmer. Farmer was then elected mayor with the support of the ANC and PA. Farmer was subsequently expelled from the DA, and joined the Patriotic Alliance (PA), standing as their candidate during the by-election. The new DA candidate increased the party's share of the vote, retaining the seat for the DA, and restoring the previous CE, DA and FF+ coalition government.

Notes

References

Cederberg Local Municipality
Cederberg
Elections in the Western Cape